Hooke is a lunar impact crater that is located to the northwest of the crater Messala, in the northeastern part of the Moon. It lies about a crater diameter to the southeast of the comparably sized Shuckburgh.

The low rim of this crater is moderately eroded, with the satellite crater Hooke D intruding slightly into the southeastern side. A small worn, crater is attached to the northern exterior rim. The interior floor has been flooded, leaving a level, featureless plain and a narrow inner wall.

Satellite craters
By convention these features are identified on lunar maps by placing the letter on the side of the crater midpoint that is closest to Hooke.

References

 
 
 
 
 
 
 
 
 
 
 
 

Impact craters on the Moon